Joseph, Pierre, Tancrède Latour (April 17, 1806 - March, 1 mars 1863) was a French Romantic drawer and painter.  His works are hosted by several museums in South of France.

From the École des Beaux-Arts of Toulouse, he teaches drawing at the Institution des Feuillants and his artist studio was frequented by Charles de Saint Félix, Eugène Fil, Jules de Lahondés, Maxime Lalanne, Louise de Carayon-Talpayrac, Eugène de Malbos and Jacques Raymond Brascassat.

He is more recognized for his drawings and his landscapes from nature - mostly of Pyrenees - than for his paintings.

Selected works 
 His works are hosted in the Gaillac Museum of Fine Arts, the Vaurais Country Museum in Lavaur, the Pyrenean Museum in Lourdes, the Musée Fabre in Montpellier and the Paul-Dupuy Museum in Toulouse.
 Exhibition: Joseph Latour (1806-1863). Drawings of a traveling painter, from Toulouse to Spain: February to May 2011, the Gaillac Museum of Fine Arts .

Gallery

Further reading
 Diaporama of 43 works from the  Latour Fund '' of the Gaillac Museum of Fine Arts on  musees-midi-pyrenees.fr
 Biographical note, prizes, awards and exhibitions during his lifetime on the website of Museums of Midi-Pyrenees
 Works by Joseph Latour on Gallica, the digital library of Bibliothèque nationale de France
 Works by Joseph Latour on Rosalis, the Toulouse digital library
 Works by Joseph Latour on Joconde, the digital database of French museums

References 

1806 births
1863 deaths
Draughtsmen
19th-century French painters
French male painters
French romantic painters
19th-century French lithographers
19th-century French male artists